Marvin Sims (born June 18, 1957) is a former American football fullback. He played for the Baltimore Colts from 1980 to 1981.

References

1957 births
Living people
American football fullbacks
Clemson Tigers football players
Baltimore Colts players